Platyptilia ignifera is a moth of the family Pterophoridae. It is known from Japan (Honshu, Kyushu, Tsushima) and India.

The length of the forewings is 9–10 mm.

The larvae feed on the fruit of Vitis vinifera.

External links
Taxonomic and Biological Studies of Pterophoridae of Japan (Lepidoptera)
Japanese Moths

ignifera
Moths of Asia
Moths of Japan
Moths described in 1908